Badinage may refer to:
 Banter
 Good-natured repartee
Badinerie or scherzo (in classical music)